The Longwood Avenue station is a local station on the IRT Pelham Line of the New York City Subway. It is served by the 6 train at all times and is located at Longwood Avenue and Southern Boulevard in the Longwood neighborhood of the Bronx. The station opened in 1919 as part of an extension of the Pelham Line of the Interborough Rapid Transit Company, and had its platforms extended in the 1960s. Further renovations were completed in 2019 and 2020.

History 
This station opened on January 7, 1919 as part of the extension of the Pelham Line from Third Avenue–138th Street to Hunts Point Avenue. The extension was completed by the Interborough Rapid Transit Company as part of the Dual Contracts with the New York City.

From October 28, 2019 to December 2019, the northbound platform was temporarily closed for repairs. From February 3, 2020 to April 10, 2020, the southbound platform was similarly temporarily closed for repairs.

Station layout

This underground station has three tracks and two side platforms. The center express track is used by the weekday peak direction <6> service.

Both platforms have their original Dual Contracts mosaic trim line and name tablets. The Vickers geometric design shows a diamond pattern in sea-foam green with a border of darker green mixed with blue. "L" plaques for "Longwood Avenue" run along the trim line at regular intervals. The name tablets are bordered in mixed shades of green and brown, and read "LONGWOOD AVE." in all-caps, serif white lettering on a mottled blue background. Light green I-beam columns run along the platforms at their center at regular intervals with every other one having the standard black name plate with white lettering.

Both platforms were extended at either ends in the 1960s to accommodate the current standard length of an IRT train. The extensions are noticeable as they are narrower than the rest of the platforms, have no columns, and the trim line is blue with "LONGWOOD AVE" in white sans serif font. The extensions result in the platforms being slightly offset.

There are no crossovers or crossunders to allow free transfers between directions. The southbound platform has a green fiberglass bucket seat bench built in the extended area in the 1960s.

Exits
Both platforms have one same-level fare control area at the east (railroad north) end. Each one has a turnstile bank, token booth, and two street stairs. The ones on the Pelham Bay Park-bound platform go up to either southern corner of Southern Boulevard and Longwood Avenue while the ones on the Manhattan-bound platform go up to either northern corner.

References

External links 

 
 Station Reporter — 6 Train
 The Subway Nut — Longwood Avenue Pictures
 Longwood Avenue entrance from Google Maps Street View
 Platforms from Google Maps Street View

IRT Pelham Line stations
New York City Subway stations in the Bronx
Railway stations in the United States opened in 1919
Longwood, Bronx